Makwal Kalan union council is in the Taunsa Tehsil subdivision of Dera Ghazi Khan District in the Punjab province of Pakistan, and is located at 30°35'06"N 70°43'55"E at an altitude of .

Makwal Kalan is 60 km radially north of Dera Ghazi Khan and is 4 km from the geographical centre of Pakistan, close to the Sulaiman Mountains and Taunsa Barrage.

The major tribe in the town is the Nutkani Jamali Baloch. The fertile agricultural lands produce many different crops.

During the floods in 2010, people from the town hosted many flood victims.

See also
Government Boys High School Makwal Kalan
Wantsn69 kids

References

Populated places in Dera Ghazi Khan District
Union councils of Dera Ghazi Khan District
Cities and towns in Punjab, Pakistan